Andole Assembly constituency is a SC reserved constituency of Telangana Legislative Assembly, India. It is one of 10 constituencies in Medak district. It is part of Zahirabad Lok Sabha constituency.

Kranthi Kiran, a Telugu journalist of TRS defeated the ex-deputy chief minister Damodar Raja Narasimha in the 2018 assembly elections.

Mandals
The Assembly constituency presently comprises the following mandals:

Election results

2018

2014

See also
 List of constituencies of Telangana Legislative Assembly

References

Assembly constituencies of Telangana
Medak district